Vanda lamellata is a species of orchid found from the Japanese Ryukyu Islands (Senkaku-gunto), Taiwan (Lan Yü), to the Philippines, and northern Malaysian Borneo.

References

External links 

lamellata
Flora of the Ryukyu Islands
Orchids of Japan
Orchids of the Philippines
Orchids of Taiwan
Orchids of Borneo
Orchids of Malaysia